A clock is an instrument for measuring time.

Clock, CLOCK, or Clocks may also refer to:

Music
 Clock (band), a band featuring Vivian Campbell and P.J. Smith
 Clocks (band), a London musical group formed in 2000
 Clocks (American band), a Wichita new wave/pop rock band
 Clock (dance act), an English band primarily led by Stu Allan
 Symphony No. 101 (Haydn) or "The Clock"

Songs
 "Clocks" (song), a 2002 song by Coldplay
 "Clocks", a 1974 song by Paul Brett
 "Clock", a 1997 song by Coal Chamber from Coal Chamber
 "Clock", a 1980 song by The Danse Society
 "Clock", a song by Velocity Girl

Science
 Clock (constellation)
 CLOCK (Circadian Locomotor Output Cycles Kaput), a gene related to circadian rhythms
 Clock, the spherical seed head of a mature dandelion

Technology
 Clock generator, an electronic oscillator that produces a clock signal for use in synchronizing a circuit's operation.
 Clock (cryptography), a method to facilitate decrypting German Enigma ciphers
 Clock (iOS), a bundled iPhone app
 Alarms & Clock, a bundled Microsoft Windows app
 Clock, a page replacement algorithm

Other uses
Clock (restaurant), a Swedish hamburger restaurant chain
Clock, an ornamental design on the ankle or side of a sock
Clock Patience, a card game

See also
 The Clock (disambiguation)
 The Clocks, a work of detective fiction by Agatha Christie
 
 CLOCKSS, a closed system using LOCKSS technology 
 Clog (disambiguation)
 Cloqué, a cloth